Shirvan County is in North Khorasan province, Iran. The capital of the county is the city of Shirvan. At the 2006 census, the county's population was 152,493 in 37,647 households. The following census in 2011 counted 157,014 people in 43,009 households. At the 2016 census, the county's population was 146,140 in 43,873 households.

Kurmanji Kurds, Persians, Khorasani Turks, and Tats are the largest ethnic groups in the county. A small Jewish population was noted to be present also, numbering only five.

Administrative divisions

The population history and structural changes of Shirvan County's administrative divisions over three consecutive censuses are shown in the following table. The latest census shows three districts, nine rural districts, and three cities.

Geography 
Shirvan city with an area of 3789 square kilometers, which is limited to Turkmenistan from the north, Esfarayen city from the south, Farooj county from the east and Bojnourd from the west. In the north of Shirvan, there is a city called Lujli. Shirvan is one of the high cities of North Khorasan province, which is located in the valley of the Atrak border river in the middle of Kopedagh and Aladagh mountains. Shirvan has a relatively cold climate in winter and a warm and temperate climate in summer.

Estarkhi waterfall 
Estarkhi waterfall is one of the tallest waterfalls in Shirvan region. The length of this waterfall reaches 20 meters. This waterfall is located 40 km south of Shirvan city, on the northern slopes of Shah Jahan mountain range. On the way to reach this waterfall, Golian Cave is also one of the natural attractions of this region.

Notable people
 Abdolreza Rahmani Fazli, born 1959 in Shirvan; Interior Minister of President Hassan Rouhani

See also 
 Shirvan
 Shirvan, Iran

References

 

Counties of North Khorasan Province